Prokowo  (Cashubian Prokòwò) is a big village in the administrative district of Gmina Kartuzy, within Kartuzy County, Pomeranian Voivodeship, in northern Poland.

For details of the history of the region, see History of Pomerania.

The village has a population of 1,500.

References

Prokowo